Oldervik may refer to the following locations:

Oldervik, Finnmark, a village in Kvalsund municipality, Finnmark county, Norway
Oldervik, Lebesby, a village in Lebesby municipality, Finnmark county, Norway
Oldervik, Troms, a village in Tromsø municipality, Troms county, Norway
Oldervika, Rødøy (sometimes called Oldervik), a village in Rødøy municipality, Nordland county, Norway

See also
Oldervika (disambiguation)